Mohammed Aziz (born as Sayeed Mohammed Aziz-Un-Nabi; 2 July 1954 – 27 November 2018), also known as Munna (Name Given By Legendary Music Composer Akshaya Mohanty, was an Indian multilingual playback singer who primarily sang for the Bollywood, Odia films., Bengali and  He sang about twenty thousand songs, including Bhajans,Sufi devotional songs and other genres in more than ten different Indian languages. He made his first appearance in films Odia film titled Jaga Hatare Pagha directed by Mohammad Mohsin, with the song Rupa Sagadi re Suna Kaniya. This is one of the most popular songs in Odisha and is sung in almost all the marriages. Later He Sung Most Numbers of songs in Odia  and for Ollywood Actor Siddhanta Mahapatra. Later he appeared with a Hindi film titled Ambar (1984) and His two prominent songs, including "Mard Tangewala" composed by Anu Malik were introduced in Mard.

He had sung numerous duets in 1980s and 1990s with singers like Lata Mangeshkar, Asha Bhosle, K.S.Chithra , Sulakshana Pandit, Vijayta Pandit, Usha Mangeshkar, Anuradha Paudwal, Kavita Krishnamurthy, Sadhana Sargam, S. Janaki, Alka Yagnik, Salma Agha, Hemlata, Sapna Mukherjee, Chandrani Mukherjee, Poornima, Sarika Kapoor, Uttara Kelkar and Alisha Chinai. Many of his songs such as "Main Deewana Na Jana Kab", "Lal Dupatta Malmal Ka", "My Name Is Lakhan", "Main Teri Mohabbat Mein", "Aap Ke Aa Jane Se", "Aajkal Yaad Kuchh" and "Dil Le Gayi Teri Bindiya" are recognized among the prominent songs he sang as a playback singer. He could sing at the 7th note (Saatwan Sur).

Originally a restaurant singer, he went to Mumbai around 1984 where he was introduced to the Hindi cinema by Anu Malik. The recipient of two uncertain awards for Best Playback Singer, his last film was Kaafila. Prior to this, he sang for the film Karan Arjun.

Career
He was involved with music during his childhood. Later He started his professional musical career in films Odia film titled Manini (1979) Under Great Odia Music Composer Radha Krushna Bhanja and later He Sung Most Numbers of songs in Odia and Ollywood Actor Siddhanta Mahapatra . Later He appeared with a Bengali film titled Bouma (1986). He went to Mumbai for better career opportunities in film industry where he was introduced to Bollywood's film Ambar (1984) by music director Sapan-Jagmohan; however his first prominent singing role appeared in Mard'' film, by music director Anu Malik. The title song "Mard Tangewala" of this film became a super hit. After the success of this song he had several hits in 1985 such as "Aate Aate Teri Yaad Aa Gayi" from Jaan Ki Baazi. Since then, he was the most sought after singer in Bollywood film industry in that decade. He worked with several famous music directors such as Naushad, Shankar–Jaikishan, O. P. Nayyar, Ravi, Khayyam, Kalyanji-Anandji, Laxmikant-Pyarelal, R. D. Burman, Bappi Lahiri, Rajesh Roshan, Usha Khanna, Anu Malik, Anand–Milind, Jatin–Lalit, Ravindra Jain, Raamlaxman, Aadesh Shrivastava, Nadeem-Shravan, Viju Shah, Dilip Sen-Sameer Sen among others. He had sung nearly 250+ songs for Laxmikant Pyarelal which is the highest for any composers he has sung for. He had also sung Lord Jagannath, bhajans, private music albums and Odia film songs until he was introduced as a playback singer in Hindi language films. Besides working in films, he also participated in stage shows in India and other countries.

During his career, Mohammed Aziz has sung for Bollywood actors Dilip Kumar, Shammi Kapoor, Dharmendra, Jeetendra, Amitabh Bachchan, Rajesh Khanna, Vinod Khanna, Shatrughan Sinha, Shashi Kapoor, Rishi Kapoor, Mithun Chakraborty, Naseeruddin Shah, Hemant Birje, Chunky Pandey, Govinda, Sanjay Dutt, Kumar Gaurav, Siddhanta Mahapatra, Shah Rukh Khan, Nana Patekar, Rajinikanth, Kamal Haasan, Raj Babbar, Sunny Deol, Anil Kapoor, Akshay Kumar, Ajay Devgan, Sumeet Saigal, Farooq Sheikh, Jackie Shroff, Aditya Pancholi and several others. Apart from the female singers, he appeared in some duets with Kishore Kumar, Amit Kumar, S. P. Balasubrahmanyam, Suresh Wadkar, Manhar Udhas, Shailendra Singh, Nitin Mukesh, Kumar Sanu, Vinod Rathod and Sudesh Bhosle.

Death
He was arriving from Kolkata to Mumbai on 27 November and he subsequently collapsed at Chhatrapati Shivaji Maharaj International Airport where he was taken to Nanavati hospital for medical treatment. He died at hospital on 27 November 2018 of cardiac arrest, aged 64.

Discography

Duets with Kavita Krishnamurthy

References

External links
 

1954 births
2018 deaths
Bollywood playback singers
Bengali playback singers
Indian male playback singers
Musicians from Kolkata
Musicians from Mumbai